The 1953 Tour de Hongrie was the 15th edition of the Tour de Hongrie cycle race and was held from 6 to 10 September 1953. The race started and finished in Budapest. The race was won by József Kis-Dala.

Route

General classification

References

1953
Tour de Hongrie
Tour de Hongrie